The NWA World Women's Tag Team Championship is a women's professional wrestling tag team championship defended in member promotions of the National Wrestling Alliance (NWA).

History
From the early 1950s through 1983, it was the first women's world tag team championship in professional wrestling and was initially referred to simply as the Women's World Tag Team Championship, before briefly adopting the NWA prefix. The championship was later acquired by the World Wrestling Federation (WWF, now WWE) in 1983 when the WWF, once a member of the NWA, bought the rights to the championship from The Fabulous Moolah and continued to use the belts. This ended the lineage of the NWA title and began a new one for the WWF Women's Tag Team Championship.

On July 16, 2021, Mickie James, the producer of NWA EmPowerrr, announced the revival of the championship by the NWA, where the winners would be crowned at the EmPowerrr pay-per-view on August 28. At the event, The Hex (Allysin Kay and Marti Belle) won the revived titles after defeating the team of Red Velvet and KiLynn King in the tournament final.

Reigns

Names

Combined reigns 

By team

By wrestler

See also 
 WWF Women's Tag Team Championship
 WWE Women's Tag Team Championship
 Women's World Tag Team Championship

Footnotes

References

External links

National Wrestling Alliance championships
World professional wrestling championships
Women's professional wrestling tag team championships